Ahmed Ziwar Pasha (1864–1945) was the prime minister of Egypt from 24 November 1924 to 7 June 1926.

References

1864 births
1945 deaths
20th-century prime ministers of Egypt
Prime Ministers of Egypt
Egyptian pashas
Endowments Ministers of Egypt